Kaat Van Daele (born 24 August 1989) is a Belgian figure skater. She is a two-time Belgian national champion and has qualified twice for the free skate at the European Championships.

Career 
Van Daele began skating when she was 6 or 7 years old. She finished second at Belgian Nationals several times before winning her first title in 2013. That same season, she finished 18th at the European Championships and competed at her first World Championships, where she placed 28th. 

In the 2013–14 season, Van Daele won her second national title and placed 20th at the European Championships.

Programs

Competitive highlights

References

External links 

 
 Kaat Van Daele at sport-folio.net

1989 births
Belgian female single skaters
Living people
Sportspeople from Ghent
21st-century Belgian women